Parwana (translation: moth) is a 2003 Indian Hindi-language action thriller film directed by Deepak Bahry. The film stars Ajay Devgn, Amisha Patel and Pooja Batra in the lead roles. Devgn did this film only for money, since he suffered huge losses due to the failure of his home production Raju Chacha. 

The film started in 1999/2000, but delays resulted in the it being released worldwide on 12th September 2003. Upon release, it was panned by critics for it's storyline, acting, visual effects and action sequences, though Devgn received some praise for his performance. Commercially, it failed at the box office.

Summary
Shahtaj belongs to a group of Jihad freedom fighters who have taken it upon themselves to free Kashmir from the clutches of India. They are now ready to terrorize Bombay but before that could happen, Shahtaj is captured by Indian Intelligence agents and held in an interrogation cell. When he is being transported to another facility, his colleagues dramatically help him escape via a helicopter. Now there is virtually no one who can stop Shahtaj and his men from carrying out terrorist attacks on Bombay during the Ganesh Visharjan day, when thousands of people converge near the beaches to immerse Bhagwan Shri Ganesh into the sea. Then a bumbling con-man and thief, who calls himself Parwana, robs the suitcase that contains the bomb. Shortly thereafter, Parwana is arrested by Police Inspector Hardev Singh Haryanvi and held for interrogation. Hardev comes to the defense of Parwana and guarantees that he has nothing to do with the bomb and is not a terrorist. Then Parwana escapes, Hardev is shot and hospitalized in a critical condition, and the police have launched a manhunt for Parwana, who is now being labeled as a terrorist. In the meantime, Shahtaj and his men also group together to hunt down Parwana, who has the bomb in his possession. Looks all exits are closed for Parwana and he is all set to detonate himself with the explosive on his person.

Cast
Ajay Devgn as Parwana
Amisha Patel as  Pooja
Pooja Batra as  Parwana's associate
Jagdeep as Seth Malpani
Kader Khan as Ismailbhai Muskurahat
Sharat Saxena as Shahtaj
Sadashiv Amrapurkar as Inspector Hardev Singh Haryanvi
Gulshan Grover as Inspector Tode
Sayaji Shinde as Yashwantrao Waghmare
Akhilendra Mishra as Police Commissioner Tyagi
Nawab Shah as P.P. Yadav
Ketki Dave as Kamini Haryanvi
Gajendra Chouhan as Ganesh fest dancer
Brijesh Tiwari as Hotel Manager

Soundtrack
Music by Sanjeev Darshan.

References

External links
 

2003 films
2000s Hindi-language films
2003 action films
Films scored by Sanjeev Darshan
Films about terrorism in India
Films set in Jammu and Kashmir
Films set in Mumbai
Kashmir conflict in films
Indian action films
Films directed by Deepak Bahry